Mahadevan "Satha" Sathasivam (18 October 1915, Ceylon – 9 July 1977 in Colombo, Sri Lanka), or Satha as he was known, is one of the greatest batsmen from Sri Lankan whom Garry Sobers called "the greatest batsman ever on earth,"  and Frank Worrell called him "the best batsman he had ever seen".He was the first, and probably the only, man to captain three national teams.  Sathasivam played cricket in the 1940s through the 1960s. He was captain of the Ceylon team in 1948, and then captain of the Singapore team, and finally captain of the Malaysian team. He was accused and acquitted of murdering his wife, which gained much attention in Ceylon.

Early life and family
Sathasivam was educated at St. Joseph's College and at Wesley College, Colombo. With the on set of World War II in the Far East, he was commissioned as a Second Lieutenant in the Ceylon Light Infantry as part of the war time expansion in 1940. 

Sathasivam married Paripoornam Anandam Rajendra, younger daughter of Mr and Mrs Ramanathan Rajendra, a granddaughter of Sir Ponnambalam Ramanathan in 1941. Anandam Rajendra inherited substantial assets including half share of the family home "Sukhasthan" at Horton Place, Colombo 7. They had four daughters. The marriage turned out to be a unhappy one with, Anandam Rajendra filling for divorce in 1944 and again in 1951, after he had started an affair with Yvonne Stevenson.

Cricketing career
Sathasivam started his cricketing career in his school days, playing for St. Joseph's and later for Wesley College until 1937. He then played in the club level matches, playing for the Tamil Union Cricket and Athletic Club and later captained its team. He first played for Ceylon in 1945, when international matches started with visiting teams after the end of the war. In 1948, in a controversial decision of the Ceylon Cricket Association selected Mahadeva Sathasivam of the Tamil Union to lead the All-Ceylon XI team.

Sathasivam murder case
In 1951, Sathasivam was arrested and accused of murdering his wife Anandam Rajendra, who was found dead at her home on 9 October 1951. He was acquitted after a twenty-month sensational trial, having spent twenty-months in remand prison. He stood trial before a special jury at the Assizes Court of the Western Province, presided over by Justice Noel Gratiaen. He was acquitted by a unanimous verdict and three prosecution witnesses were sentenced to jail for perjury. His defense team was led by Dr Colvin R de Silva. The defense flew in Sir Sydney Smith, a forensic scientist from the United Kingdom, to aid in its case. Nonetheless, he left Ceylon because of the negative publicity and Colvin R de Silva lost the Wellawatte-Galkissa seat in the 1952 general elections.

Later life
He later married Yvonne Stevenson in London, they had three children. Sathasivam settled in Singapore where he captained its cricket team, and then later, after that island's merger with its northern neighbour, Sathasivam led the Malaysian team as well.

References & notes

External links
 Mahadevan Sathasivam at Cricinfo
 Mahadevan Sathasivam at CricketArchive
 "Mahadevan Sathasivam: A forgotten prince of Sri Lanka cricket" by Theviyanthan Krishnamohan

1915 births
Malaysian people of Indian descent
1977 deaths
Sri Lankan cricketers
All-Ceylon cricketers
The Rest cricketers
Sri Lankan Tamil sportspeople
People acquitted of murder
Prisoners and detainees of Sri Lanka
Sri Lankan prisoners and detainees
Malaysian people of Sri Lankan Tamil descent
Singaporean people of Indian descent
Singaporean people of Sri Lankan Tamil descent
Alumni of Saint Joseph's College, Colombo
Alumni of Wesley College, Colombo
Ceylon Light Infantry officers